Buran (meaning "Snowstorm" or "Blizzard"; GRAU index serial number: 11F35 1K, construction number: 1.01) was the first spaceplane to be produced as part of the Soviet/Russian Buran program. Besides describing the first operational Soviet/Russian shuttle orbiter, "Buran" was also the designation for the entire Soviet/Russian spaceplane project and its orbiters, which were known as "Buran-class orbiters".

Buran completed one uncrewed spaceflight in 1988, and was destroyed in the 2002 collapse of its storage hangar. The Buran-class orbiters used the expendable Energia rocket, a class of super heavy-lift launch vehicle.

It is named after the Asian wind.

Construction

The construction of the Buran spacecraft began in 1980, and by 1984 the first full-scale orbiter was rolled out. Over 1000 companies all over the Soviet Union were involved in construction and development. The Buran spacecraft was made to be launched on the Soviet Union's super-heavy lift vehicle, Energia. The Buran program ended in 1993.

Technical description 

The Buran orbiter is built around the airframe, which is its main structural component, since all other components are attached to it. The components necessary for flight make up approx. 20% of the weight of the orbiter, while another 11% of weight is added by payload systems and removable parts. The wings of the Buran orbiter contain elevators whose position can be changed from +35° to −20°.

Exterior 
Similarly to US space shuttle orbiters, Buran orbiters have their exterior covered in 38,600 heat shielding tiles designed to withstand 100 reentries, which themselves were very similar to the ones in the space shuttle, however, the carbon-carbon Buran heat tiles have an antioxidant molybdenum disilicide coating. The black coating in the carbon-carbon heat tiles helps dissipate heat, and, similarly to the heat tiles used in the space shuttle, Buran heat tiles are glued to the orbiter, and the bottom of the heat tiles are left uncoated to equalize the pressure in the tile with that of its surroundings, preventing additional mechanical loads. The gaps between tiles are deliberate to allow for thermal expansion. The gaps were filled with quartz fiber, rope, alkaline elements, inserts and brush seals, and the carbon-carbon heat tiles were also waterproofed.

The Buran and space shuttle orbiters are exposed to similar temperatures, and both have similar levels of insulation. 
Buran has a different carbon-carbon heat tile layout in its underside, in which all gaps between heat tiles are parallel or perpendicular to the direction of airflow through the orbiter's underside, reducing heat in between heat tiles and in the boundary layer between the heat tiles and surrounding air, while helping maintain a laminar airflow through the orbiter.

Crew module 
The crew module is an all-metal, welded, pressurised compartment housing the crew's workplaces, control and life support systems. It has three decks. The flight deck, known as the Command Compartment (KO), is the workspace for the crew and serves to accommodate the commander, pilot, engineer and mission specialist's seats, as well as the RMS operator's workplace. The middeck or Habitation Compartment (BO), serves as the living and sleeping quarters for the crew. It contains lockers, a galley, sleeping bags and a toilet in addition to three instrument bays with radio equipment and thermal control systems. Up to six crewmembers could be seated in the middeck during launch and reentry. The lower deck, known as the Aggregate Compartment (AO) houses the life support system, the power supply systems and parts of the thermal control system. The cockpit is similar in layout to that of the space shuttle, with three cathode-ray tube displays.

Automatic landing system 
The automatic landing system is capable of performing a fully automatic descent, approach and landing from any point located in the "admissible starting conditions area" at  altitude, controlling the orbiter's flight during the descent.

The first Buran flight was notable for the automatic landing system electing to perform an unlikely (estimated 3% probability) manoeuvre at the  key point, which was needed to extend the glide distance and bleed excessive energy. The standard approach was from the south and consisted of two left turns onto the final approach course. Instead, it performed additional turns in both directions and overflew the field to its northern side, before making a right turn back onto the final course.

Docking system 

The docking module is mounted into the forward part of the payload bay. Unlike the U.S. Space Shuttle, the docking compartment for Buran features an extendable tunnel to increase clearance between orbiter and station. Another hatch, facing into the payload bay, was to support extravehicular activity from the orbiter.

Remote manipulator 
The Onboard Manipulator System, similar to the Space Shuttle's RMS, was developed at the Central Research and Development Institute for Robotics and Technical Cybernetics to support operations with payload. It could be operated both in manual and automatic modes. Buran-class orbiter could carry, depending on the mission, one or two manipulator arms.

Laboratory modules 
To expand Buran capabilities, pressurised modules similar to ESA's Spacelab were designed based on the 37K design. These modules had to be both compartments to conduct experiments and logistics volume, could be mounted either in the payload bay and connected to the crew cabin via tunnel or be temporarily docked to Mir's Kristall radial docking port. On Buran maiden flight, the Accessory Unit 37KB No.37070 was installed into the orbiter's payload bay. It carried recording equipment and accumulators providing power to onboard systems as the regular fuel cells based power system were not ready at the time. The second unit, 37KB No.37071 was built in 1987. It was planned to build a third unit, 37KB No.37072, but this never happened because of programme cancellation.

Propulsion 
Orbital maneuvering is provided by the Joint Propulsion System.

Operational history

Orbital flight
The only orbital launch of a Buran-class orbiter, 1K1 (first orbiter, first flight) occurred at 03:00:02 UTC on 15 November 1988 from Baikonur Cosmodrome launch pad 110/37. Buran was lifted into space, on an uncrewed mission, by the specially designed Energia rocket. The automated launch sequence performed as specified, and the Energia rocket lifted the vehicle into a temporary orbit before the orbiter separated as programmed. After boosting itself to a higher orbit and completing two orbits around the Earth, the ODU (Combined Propulsion System) engines fired automatically to begin the descent into the atmosphere, return to the launch site, and horizontal landing on a runway.

After making an automated approach to Site 251, Buran touched down under its own control at 06:24:42 UTC and came to a stop at 06:25:24, 206 minutes after launch. It was the first spaceplane to perform an uncrewed flight, including landing in fully automatic mode. It was later found that Buran had lost eight of its 38,000 thermal tiles over the course of its flight, as compared to e.g. 16 foam pieces for mission STS-114 of the Space Shuttle.

Projected flights
In 1989, it was projected that Buran would have an uncrewed second flight by 1993, with a duration of 15–20 days. Although the Buran programme was never officially cancelled, the dissolution of the Soviet Union led to funding drying up and this flight never took place.

Specifications

The mass of Buran is quoted as 62 tons, with a maximum payload of 30 tons, for a total lift-off weight of 105 tons.

Mass breakdown
 Total mass of structure and landing systems: 
 Mass of functional systems and propulsion: 
 Maximum payload: 
 Maximum liftoff weight: 

Dimensions
 Length: 
 Wingspan: 
 Height on gear: 
 Payload bay length: 
 Payload bay diameter: 
 Wing chine sweep: 78 degrees
 Wing sweep: 45 degrees

Propulsion
 Total orbital manoeuvring engine thrust: 
 Orbital manoeuvring engine specific impulse: 
 Total manoeuvring impulse: unknown
 Total RCS thrust: 
 Average RCS specific impulse: 
 Normal maximum propellant load: 

Unlike the US Space Shuttle, which was propelled by a combination of solid boosters and the orbiter's own liquid-propellant engines fuelled from a large tank, the Soviet/Russian launch system used thrust from each booster's RD-170 liquid oxygen/kerosene engine (each with 4 nozzles), developed by Valentin Glushko, and another four RD-0120 liquid oxygen/liquid hydrogen engines attached to the central block.

List of vehicles 

Five orbiters were planned to be built (designated 1K-5K, K stands for ), and hull numbering starts with 1 or 2 (e.g. 1.01), two originally ordered in 1970s and three ("second series") additionally ordered in 1983. For research and testing purposes, several test articles produced, designated 1M-8M (M stands for ), hull numbering starts with 0 (e.g. 0.02).

By 1991 two operational vehicles were delivered to Baikonur, three others were under construction at Tushino.

Most of the geo-locations below show the orbiter bodies on the ground; in some cases Google Earth's History facility is required to see the orbiter within the dates specified.

Related test vehicles and models

See also

 MAKS (spacecraft) – Soviet air-launched spaceplane concept
 Mikoyan-Gurevich MiG-105 – Soviet spaceplane test program
 OK-GLI – Buran Analog BST-02 test vehicle
 Space Shuttle program – American spaceplane program
 Tupolev OOS – Soviet air-launched spaceplane concept

References

Further reading

External links

Buran-class orbiters
Aircraft first flown in 1988
Crewed spacecraft
Man-made disasters in Kazakhstan
Partially reusable space launch vehicles
Rocket-powered aircraft
Soviet inventions
Spacecraft launched by Zenit and Energia rockets
Spacecraft launched in 1988
Tailless delta-wing aircraft
1988 in the Soviet Union
2002 disasters in Kazakhstan
2002 in Kazakhstan